Anna Carin Lock is a Swedish make-up artist. She was nominated for an Academy Award in the category Best Makeup and Hairstyling for the film House of Gucci.

Selected filmography 
 House of Gucci (2021; co-nominated with Göran Lundström and Frederic Aspiras)

References

External links 

Living people
Year of birth missing (living people)
Place of birth missing (living people)
Swedish make-up artists